Vladimir Grigoryevich Proskurin (24 January 1945 – 19 July 2020) was a Soviet Russian football player and coach.

He is most notable as the co-top scorer of the 1969 Soviet Top League with 16 goals. He was not awarded the top scorer prize as the Trud newspaper which was awarding said prize suspected that the last game of the season, in which he scored a hat-trick to catch up to Nikolai Osyanin on the scorers list, was fixed (his team FC SKA Rostov-on-Don played FC Torpedo Kutaisi with a score of 3-3, Kutaisi's Dzhemal Kherhadze, who also scored a hat-trick to catch up with Osyanin, was not awarded the prize either). Formally the decision was justified by Osyanin scoring in "more important" games.

External links

References

1945 births
Footballers from Voronezh
2020 deaths
Soviet footballers
Russian footballers
FC Fakel Voronezh players
FC SKA Rostov-on-Don players
FC Spartak Moscow players
Soviet Top League players
Soviet football managers
Russian football managers
FC Fakel Voronezh managers
Association football forwards